Taj Anwar is a community organizer and promoter.  She has worked with the FTP Movement, Mothers of Black/Brown Babies, and Crew Love.

Activism 
While pregnant with her second child, Jackson went on to establish Mothers of Black/Brown Babies from her negative experience with the governmental assistance programs for families.

Personal life 
She has a son nicknamed "Dub," a son named Amon, and a daughter, Peaches.

References

External links
http://www.dopestfamily.com/#!tajanwarisbsk/cee5

https://web.archive.org/web/20140210081218/http://www.tajanwarjackson.com/ 
http://www.modelmayhem.com/172170

Living people
Year of birth missing (living people)